Flagello is a surname. Notable people with the surname include:

Ezio Flagello (1931–2009), American operatic bass
Nicolas Flagello (1928–1994), American composer and conductor